Putt & Putter is a miniature golf game released for the Master System in April 1992 and Sega Game Gear in December 1991.  It was developed by SIMS Co, and published by Sega. In Brazil the game was called Mini-Golf. The description on the back of the box describes it as a cross between mini-golf and pinball, and the game plays very much as it is described.

Gameplay
There are 18 holes in the game that increase in difficulty as the player progresses.  Holes all have various obstacles that must be negotiated including sand traps, moving platforms and pinball style bumpers  Almost all holes are surrounded by water and shots ending up off the course are given a one-stroke penalty.  The holes are viewed from an isometric viewpoint.
Shots are taken by using the directional pad to line up the shot and pressing a button on the control pad to start the power gauge, pressing it again selects the desired power.
The 18 holes are split down into three groups of six holes, the player must finish each set either in par or under-par to move on to the next set.

Multiplayer
A two-player mode is included and this takes the form of two balls in play simultaneously.  Unlike in full scale golf it is possible for one ball to hit the other without a penalty being incurred.  This adds a strategic element to the multiplayer game.

Reception
Defunctgames.com gave it a 40%, citing poor course design as a major flaw.
Issue 34 of Games-X magazine (December 1991) rated the Game Gear version of the game as 3/5.
In January 1992, Power Play magazine gave the game a score of 57/100.
Sega Power magazine gave the game a score of 81/100 praising the gameplay especially the 2 player mode stating “Great fun for 2 players, this is one of those games that look awful, feels dated but has better gameplay then many other more hi-profile titles around at the mo.”

External links
 Putt & Putter at MobyGames
 Putt & Putter at GameFAQs (Master System)
 Putt & Putter at GameFAQs (Game Gear)

Notes

1991 video games
Master System games
Miniature golf video games
Game Gear games
SIMS Co., Ltd. games
Sega video games
Multiplayer and single-player video games
Video games developed in Japan